Bharatiya Bhasha Parishad, a Kolkata-based literary organization was founded on 1975 by Sitaram Seksaria and Bhagirat H Kanodia with the aim of promoting Indian languages. It works for the development of Indian literature through publication of books on literature and implementation of various literary projects. It honors Indian writers for the contribution to Indian literature through their respective languages. The award consists of cash prize 1 lakh, a memento and a shawl.

Award Recipients

 Nabaneeta Dev Sen
 Tilottoma Misra was awarded the Ishan Puraskar for her novel Swarnalata in 1995.

See also 
 Manipuri Sahitya Parishad
 Sahitya Akademi

References

External links
 

Non-profit organisations based in India
Indic literature societies